Geoff Rodkey (born September 9, 1970) is an American screenwriter and author.

His most recent novel is the suburban-apocalypse comedy Lights Out in Lincolnwood. Previously, he co-wrote comedian Kevin Hart's 2021 debut middle grade novel Marcus Makes a Movie and the 2019 science fiction comedy We're Not From Here. In 2018, he collaborated with the Story Pirates arts education group on The Story Pirates Present: Stuck in the Stone Age, a novel bundled with a creative writing guide for middle graders. Prior to that, his four-book series The Tapper Twins began publication in 2015 with The Tapper Twins Go To War (With Each Other). His first novel was Deadweather and Sunrise, the first book in The Chronicles of Egg comedy/adventure series for middle grade readers.

His film work includes the first two  Daddy Day Care films (2003-2007), RV, and The Shaggy Dog (both 2006).

He received an Emmy nomination for his contributions to the Politically Incorrect broadcasts from the 1996 Democratic and Republican conventions on Comedy Central.

Works

References

External links
 
The Tapper Twins | Official Site

The Chronicles of Egg
 
Scripts & Scribes Interview with Geoff Rodkey

1970 births
American children's writers
American male screenwriters
American television writers
The Harvard Lampoon alumni
Harvard University alumni
People from Freeport, Illinois
Living people
American male television writers
Screenwriters from Illinois